Sara Cerdas (born 23 March 1989) is a Portuguese medical doctor and politician who serving as a Member of the European Parliament for the Socialist Party.

Early life and career 
Cerdas was born on 23 March 1989. Having grown up in Funchal, at Madeira Island, until the age of 18 Cerdas was a competition swimmer for Clube Naval do Funchal. She represented Portugal through the national youth team and achieved medals and records at the regional and national level.

Cerdas holds a master's degree in Medicine by the University of Lisbon, post-graduation in Travel Medicine by the NOVA University of Lisbon, a master's degree in Public Health Sciences by the University of Umeå and is a PhD student in Public Health Sciences at Stockholm University, Sweden.

During her student and professional path, Cerdas was elected for representative positions in the global health field, like the International Federation of Medical Students Association (IFMSA), National Association of Medical Students (ANEM) and Students Association of the Faculty of Medicine of Lisbon (AEFML).

Political career 
In parliament, Cerdas is a member of the Committee on the Environment, Public Health and Food Safety and co-chair in the European Parliament's Health Working Group. In this capacity, she serves as her parliamentary group's shadow rapporteur on the European Commission's EU4Health program. In 2022, she joined the Special Committee on the COVID-19 pandemic.  

In addition to her committee assignments, Cerdas is part of the European Parliament Intergroup on LGBT Rights; the European Parliament Intergroup on Climate Change, Biodiversity and Sustainable Development, the European Parliament Intergroup on Seas, Rivers, Islands and Coastal Areas; the MEPs Against Cancer group; and the MEP Interest Group on Obesity & Health System Resilience.

Other activities 
 UNITE – Parliamentary Network to End HIV/AIDS, Viral Hepatitis and Other Infectious Diseases, Member (since 2021)

Recognition 
In December 2020, Cerdas received the Health award at The Parliament Magazine's annual MEP Awards.

References

1989 births
Living people
MEPs for Portugal 2019–2024
21st-century women MEPs for Portugal
Socialist Party (Portugal) MEPs